Claremontiella nodulosa, common name: the blackberry drupe, is a species of sea snail, a marine gastropod mollusk in the family Muricidae, the murex snails or rock snails.

Description
This shell commonly called Blackberry drupe is commonly found in rocky areas along South-east of Florida coast and the Florida keys. The size of an adult shell varies between 13 mm and 25 mm. Its body is encrusted and the proloconch eroded.

An adult blackberry drupe can be distinguished from others by: 

1. It's thick lips coupled with about 4-5 large beads on the inside of the lips.

2. Its purple coloured aperture.

3. Grossly studded telechonch and body whorl with round black beeds.

Distribution
This species is distributed in the Caribbean Sea, the Gulf of Mexico, the Lesser Antilles, the Atlantic Ocean along Brazil, Cape Verde, Angola and Gabon.

References

 Bernard, P.A. (Ed.) (1984). Coquillages du Gabon [Shells of Gabon]. Pierre A. Bernard: Libreville, Gabon. 140, 75 plates pp
 Gofas, S.; Afonso, J.P.; Brandào, M. (Ed.). (S.a.). Conchas e Moluscos de Angola = Coquillages et Mollusques d'Angola. [Shells and molluscs of Angola]. Universidade Agostinho / Elf Aquitaine Angola: Angola. 140 pp
 Rolán E., 2005. Malacological Fauna From The Cape Verde Archipelago. Part 1, Polyplacophora and Gastropoda. 
 Rosenberg, G., F. Moretzsohn, and E. F. García. 2009. Gastropoda (Mollusca) of the Gulf of Mexico, pp. 579–699 in Felder, D.L. and D.K. Camp (eds.), Gulf of Mexico–Origins, Waters, and Biota. Biodiversity. Texas A&M Press, College Station, Texas
 Garrigues B . & Lamy D. 2018, 218. Muricidae récoltés au cours de la campagne KARUBENTHOS 2 du MNHN dans les eaux profondes de Guadeloupe (Antilles Françaises) et description de trois nouvelles espèces des genres Pagodula et Pygmaepterys (Mollusca, Gastropoda). Xenophora Taxonomy 20: 34-52
 Houart, R.: Zuccon, D. & Puillandre, N. (2019). Description of new genera and new species of Ergalataxinae (Gastropoda: Muricidae). Novapex. 20 (Hors série 12): 1-52

External links
 Adams, C. B. (1845). Specierum novarum conchyliorum, in Jamaica repertorum, synopsis. Proceedings of the Boston Society of Natural History. 2: 1-17
 Reeve, L. A. (1846). Monograph of the genus Ricinula. In: Conchologia Iconica, or, illustrations of the shells of molluscous animals, vol. 3, pl. 1-6 and unpaginated text. L. Reeve & Co., London
 

nodulosa
Gastropods described in 1845
Molluscs of the Atlantic Ocean
Molluscs of Brazil
Molluscs of Angola
Gastropods of Cape Verde
Invertebrates of Gabon